Beyond the White House is a 2007 book by Jimmy Carter. It describes his activities after leaving the United States presidency in 1981.

References

Books by Jimmy Carter
2007 non-fiction books
American political books
Political science books
Books written by presidents of the United States